Super Tennis is a tennis video game developed and published by Sega for the Master System. It was released as a Sega Card, and additionally as a cartridge in Europe.

References

External links 

Master System games